An Afterlehen or Afterlehn (plural: Afterlehne, Afterlehen) is a fief that the liege lord has himself been given as a fief and which he has then, in turn, enfeoffed wholly or partially to a lesser vassal or vassals. The term is German. It is variously referred to in English as a mesne-fief or mesne-tenure, an arriere-fief or subfief, under-tenure or mesnalty.

Within the Holy Roman Empire, these mesne fiefs became inheritable over time and could have up to five "stations" between the actual holder of the fief and the overarching liege lord.

An example of an Afterlehen is Rothenberg Castle in Bavaria, Germany.

See also 
 Feudalism in the Holy Roman Empire
 Mesne lord

References

Literature 
 Jürgen Dendorfer/ Roman Deutinger (eds.): Das Lehnswesen im Hochmittelalter. Forschungskonstrukte – Quellenbefunde – Deutungsrelevanz. Thorbecke, Ostfildern, 2010,  (Review)
 Fahrenkrüger, Johann Anton: Nathan Bailey's Dictionary English-German and German-English — Englisch-Deutsches und Deutsch-Englisches Wörterbuch. Gänzlich umgearbeitet. Zweiter Theil. Deutsch-Englisch. Zehnte, verbesserte und vermehrte, Auflage., Friedrich Frommann, Leipzig und Jena 1801 (in German and English)
 François Louis Ganshof: Was ist das Lehnswesen?, 7th edn., Wissenschaftliche Buchgesellschaft, Darmstadt, 1989. 
 Karl-Heinz Spieß: Stichwort „Lehn(s)recht, Lehnswesen.“ In: Handwörterbuch zur deutschen Rechtsgeschichte. Vol. 2, Berlin, 1978. Sp. 1725–1741
 Karl-Heinz Spieß: Das Lehnswesen in Deutschland im hohen und späten Mittelalter. 2nd improved and expanded edition, Steiner, Stuttgart, 2009,